Gregory Harold Rickel (born June 27, 1963) is an American Episcopal bishop. From 2007 to 2022, he was the eighth bishop of the Episcopal Diocese of Olympia. He was consecrated on September 15, 2007. Bishop Rickel announced his intent to resign the episcopate effective December 31, 2022.

See also

 List of Episcopal bishops of the United States
 Historical list of the Episcopal bishops of the United States

References

External links
Diocesan website
Personal website

Living people
1963 births
Clergy from Omaha, Nebraska
Episcopal bishops of Olympia